The Emin or The Emin Society is a spiritual movement based on the work of Raymond Armin, known to members as "Leo". Originally, The Emin was named The Eminent Way or The Way. The movement arose in the 1970s. The Template Network is a movement which offers activities inspired by the Emin philosophy.
The Emin has been called a cult in books such as Spying in Guru Land: Inside Britain's Cults, by William Shaw .

History 

The movement started in London in 1973. It was first known as the Emin society and then Eminent Way, which was later abbreviated to "Emin".  In 1977 an Israeli branch emerged, and a center was established in a Tel Aviv neighborhood in 1980. By 1978 there were also groups in the USA, Canada and Australia. 

In Israel, Emin members established the village Ma'ale Tzviya in 1986.  Over the years The Emin grew to have gatherings of people in many other countries including  Ireland, France,  Greece, Italy, Germany, Denmark, Sweden, the Netherlands, Brazil, and New Zealand.

Raymond Armin (Leo) 

Raymond Armin was born in London (1926) under the name Schirtenlieb, and did most of his schooling in London, living around the St.Johns Wood area. He started his working life as an apprentice tool maker at Borehamwood near London England. Armin did time during the war in the R.A.F. as a quartermaster (His rank was staff sergeant). He married Violet Burton from Waterloo who was 8 months pregnant at the time.

After the war, Armin worked at various locations around the London areas e.g. as manager of a furniture company based in Camden Town, London, and then as a market demonstrator. During the late 1940s, while still living in central London, he became father to five   children, one died soon after birth, his name was Brian. 

He relocated in 1958 to Yorkshire to follow a new profession as a traveling salesman, selling furniture polish and then a few years later as an encyclopaedia salesman. In 1963 Armin moved to Nottinghamshire, followed by a move back to London in 1965, where he worked as a civilian driver for the metropolitan police and then as a guard for a security firm.

In 1971 John Armin son of Leo met up with a group of people who were staying in London after traveling around the world 'looking for something'. They formed into a group under 'The Armins' leadership, and all met regularly over the next few years, primarily at Leo's  flat in Stoke-newington London. 

In 1973 'The group' began which took on the name 'The Emin Society' at which time Raymond Armin became known as 'Leo' and John as 'Orman' within the society. The society used many halls around the London areas, eventually occupying a small centre at Gospel Oak in London. Autumn of 1976 saw a relocation to a larger centre at Hotham Road Studios, Hotham Road, Putney, London.

During the early 1980's Raymond Armin (aka.Leo), moved with his wife (Violet) and a woman called Ethra aka.'Deborra McKay' from Iowa, to America, where years later they took on American citizenship. 

From roughly the 1990's until his death, Armin (known as Leo), lived in a waterfront retreat at Jensen Beach Florida. Address/Property records 1592 Seahorse Pl Jensen Beach, FL 34957</ref> Armin who died in August 2002 from an aortic aneurysm. Violet Armin (Ruth) died in 2008 in her sleep. The Emin was Truly founded by 2 members of the Armin family (Orman- John and Leo- Raymond) followed by a gathering of friends interested in Ormans and Leos work. The Emin was consequential to the time of itself (1960 to 1981) and those that were its inspiration.

Philosophy

The Archives 
Armin has left numerous lectures, written and recorded on audio and video tape. These include writings on psychology and personal development, theology, cosmology, history, meditation, and various practical personal development and perception exercises. Most, but not all, of these writings were written by Raymond Armin.

The Template 
The Template is a philosophical concept, introduced by Armin in 1992. It describes the spiritual development of the non-physical body through a hierarchically structured system of 16 spheres. Every sphere, with a symbolic name like amethyst or ruby, represents a level of consciousness.

Offshoots

The Template Network 

The Template Network is an affiliation of groups involved with the Emin philosophy. It is an international network of independent groups, with interests including education, art, ecology, well-being, science and spirituality. As of 2009 there were some 1700 people regularly engaged within these groups. There are groups in Australia, Brazil, Canada, Denmark, France, Germany, Israel, Italy, the Netherlands, New Zealand, Norway, Sweden, the United Kingdom, and United States. In the UK some of the groups make use of buildings and facilities run by the Template Foundation. There are also several independent organisations and companies offering courses on a commercial basis, that draw on Emin concepts and practices. These include Blue Rose Wellness, an Emin/Template center of spiritual healing, located in Brier, Washington state, United States, and the Ruby Care Foundation, an Emin/Template charity group concerned with grief and loss management.

One premise held by Template Network groups is that creation is continuously evolving and that human life is part of that evolution. Another is that human life is an opportunity to consciously find one's own purpose within that evolution. Each individual is responsible for his or her own development and destiny.

Gemrod Foundation 
In 1985, Emin established a centre in Leiden, Netherlands. In the 1990s it founded the Gemrod Foundation, which organized esoteric workshops, e.g. courses on clairvoyance and aura reading.

References

Books

Emin and Template publications
Various books have been published in limited editions. They include:
 The trilogy   of Leo's writings:
 Frownstrong    (1974)
 Gemrod  (1976)
 Dear Dragon     (1976)
 The Blue Book Writings (Leo's poetry) 
 Sayings of Leo: Towards Yourself (Cobwebs Press, London 1978.)
 Cobwebs & Tears: A Study to Inform & Prepare  (Regal Print Company, London 1982)
 Toir.
 The Tear by John Turner, Eminent Productions Limited 2003.  .
 The Beacon of Hope by Marion Verweij, Eminent Productions Limited 2002.  .
 A new Template of Human Qualities for the Future Bound Scientist by Anne Marmenout, Eminent Productions Limited.  .

Books inspired by the Template
 The Seven Steps of Spiritual Intelligence by Richard A. Bowell, Boston, Nicholas Brealey Publishing 2004 . The back of the title page reads: This book has been derived from and inspired by the philosophical writings and researches of Leo Armin under the title of the "Template".

Books by outside observers
 Despair and Deliverance – private salvation in contemporary Israel by Benjamin Beit-Hallahmi, State University of New York 1992 . The book analyzes various religious groups in Israel from a psychological and sociological perspective, inside the contemporary Israeli context of the 1970's.

External links
 Emin web site
 Despair and Deliverance: Private Salvation in Contemporary Israel. Benjamin Beit-Hallahmi, pp. 17-  ; 1992. At Google books

Personal development
New religious movements
Self religions